Halicreatidae is a family of hydrozoans. The family comprises 6 genera and 9 species.

Taxonomy

References

 
Trachymedusae
Cnidarian families